is a man-made pond feature in Biei, Hokkaido, Japan. The colour is thought to result from the accidental presence of colloidal aluminium hydroxide in the water. Damage caused by Typhoon Mindulle in August 2016 resulted in a temporary drop in the water level and in the colour briefly turning brown with mud and sand from the Biei River.

See also

 List of Natural Monuments of Japan (Hokkaidō)

References

Biei, Hokkaido
Lakes of Hokkaido